Lippe or Lippé is a surname. Notable people with the surname include:

 Adolph Lippe (1812–1888), physician
 Edouard Lippé (1884–1956), composer
 Just Lippe (1904–1978), journalist
 Stefan Lippe (1955–2020), insurance manager
 Urbain Lippé (1831–1896), politician